The Insurgency in Kosovo began in 1995, following the Dayton Agreement that ended the Bosnian War. In 1996, the Kosovo Liberation Army (KLA) began attacking Serbian governmental buildings and police stations. This insurgency would lead to the more intense Kosovo War in February of 1998.

Background

The Albanian-Serbian conflict has its roots in the expulsion of the Albanians in 1877–1878 from areas that became incorporated into the Principality of Serbia. Animosity between these  feuding factions remains strong to this day. The 1950s and 1960s were a period marked by repression and anti Albanian policies in Kosovo under Aleksandar Ranković, a Serbian communist who later fell out and was dismissed by Tito. During this time nationalism for Kosovar Albanians became a conduit to alleviate the conditions of the time. In 1968 Yugoslav Serb officials warned about rising Albanian nationalism and by November unrest and demonstrations by thousands of Albanians followed calling for Kosovo to attain republic status, an independent Albanian language university and some for unification with Albania. Tito rewrote the Yugoslav constitution (1974) and tried to address Albanian complaints by awarding the province of Kosovo autonomy and powers such as a veto in the federal decision making process similar to that of the republics. Kosovo functioned as a de facto republic because Kosovar Albanians attained the ability to pursue near independent foreign relations, trade and cultural links with Albania, an independent Albanian language university and Albanology institute, an Academy of Sciences and Writers association with the ability to fly the Albanian flag.

Military precursors to the KLA (Kosovo Liberation Army) began in the late 1980s with armed resistance to Serb police trying to take Albanian activists in custody. Prior to the KLA, its members had been part of organizations such as the National Kosovo Movement and Popular Movement for Kosovo Liberation. The founders of the later KLA were involved in the 1981 protests in Kosovo. Many ethnic Albanian dissidents were arrested or moved to European countries, where they continued subversive activities. Repression of Albanian nationalism and Albanian nationalists by authorities in Belgrade strengthened the independence movement and focused international attention toward the plight of Kosovar Albanians.

From 1991 to 1992, Albanian nationalist Adem Jashari and about 100 other ethnic Albanians wishing to fight for the independence of Kosovo underwent military training in the municipality of Labinot-Mal in Albania. Afterwards, Jashari and other ethnic Albanians committed several acts of sabotage aimed at the Serbian administrative apparatus in Kosovo. Attempting to capture or kill him, Serbian police surrounded Jashari and his older brother, Hamëz, at their home in Prekaz on 30 December 1991. In the ensuing siege, large numbers of Kosovo Albanians flocked to Prekaz, forcing the Serbs to withdraw from the village. 

While in Albania, Jashari was arrested in 1993 by the government of Sali Berisha and sent to jail in Tirana before being released alongside other Kosovo Albanian militants at the demand of the Albanian Army. Jashari launched several attacks over the next several years, targeting the Yugoslav Army (VJ) and Serbian police in Kosovo. In the spring of 1993, "Homeland Calls" meetings were held in Aarau, Switzerland, organized by Xhavit Haliti, Azem Syla, Jashar Salihu and others.

KLA strategist Xhavit Halili said that in 1993, the KLA 'considered and then rejected the IRA, PLO and ETA models'. Some journalists claim that a May 1993 attack in Glogovac that left five Serbian policemen dead and two wounded was the first one carried out by the KLA.

History

1995
By the early 1990s, there were attacks on Serbian police forces, and secret-service officials in retaliation for abuse and murder of Albanian civilians. A Serbian policeman was killed in 1995, allegedly by the KLA. Since 1995, the KLA sought to destabilize the region, hoping the United States and NATO would intervene. Serbian patrols were ambushed and policemen were killed. It was only in the next year that the organization of KLA took responsibility for attacks.

1996–1997
The KLA, originally composed of a few hundred Albanians, attacked several police stations and wounded many police officers in 1996–1997.

In 1996 the British weekly The European carried an article by a French expert stating that "German civil and military intelligence services have been involved in training and equipping the rebels with the aim of cementing German influence in the Balkan area. (...) The birth of the KLA in 1996 coincided with the appointment of Hansjoerg Geiger as the new head of the BND (German secret Service). (...) The BND men were in charge of selecting recruits for the KLA command structure from the 500,000 Kosovars in Albania." Former senior adviser to the German parliament Matthias Küntzel tried to prove later on that German secret diplomacy had been instrumental in helping the KLA since its creation.

KLA representatives met with American, British, and Swiss intelligence agencies in 1996, and possibly "several years earlier" and according to The Sunday Times, "American intelligence agents have admitted they helped to train the Kosovo Liberation Army before NATO's bombing of Yugoslavia". Intelligence agents denied, however, that they were involved in arming the KLA.

In February 1996 the KLA undertook a series of attacks against police stations and Yugoslav government employees, saying that the Yugoslav authorities had killed Albanian civilians as part of an ethnic cleansing campaign. Serbian authorities denounced the KLA as a terrorist organization and increased the number of security forces in the region. This had the counter-productive effect of boosting the credibility of the embryonic KLA among the Kosovo Albanian population. On 22 April 1996, four attacks on Serbian security personnel were carried out almost simultaneously in several parts of Kosovo.

In January 1997, Serbian security forces assassinated KLA commander Zahir Pajaziti and two other leaders in a highway attack between Pristina and Mitrovica, and arrested more than 100 Albanian militants.

Jashari, as one of the originators and leaders of the KLA, was convicted of terrorism in absentia by a Yugoslav court on 11 July 1997. Human Rights Watch subsequently described the trial, in which fourteen other Kosovo Albanians were also convicted, as "[failing] to conform to international standards."

The 1997 civil unrest in Albania enabled the KLA to acquire large amounts of weapons looted from Albanian armories. A 1997 intelligence report stated that the KLA received drug trafficking proceeds, used to purchase arms. The KLA received large funds from Albanian diaspora organizations. There is a possibility that among donators to the KLA were people involved in illegal activities such as drug trafficking, however insufficient evidence exists that the KLA itself was involved in such activities.

1998

Months before the NATO bombing of Yugoslavia, the North Atlantic Council said that the KLA was "the main initiator of the violence" and that it had "launched what appears to be a deliberate campaign of provocation".

James Bissett, former Canadian Ambassador to Yugoslavia, Bulgaria and Albania, wrote in 2001 that media reports indicate that "as early as 1998, the Central Intelligence Agency assisted by the British Special Air Service were arming and training Kosovo Liberation Army members in Albania to foment armed rebellion in Kosovo" with the hope that "NATO could intervene (...)".

Pursuing Adem Jashari for the murder of a Serb policeman, the Serbian forces again attempted to assault the Jashari compound in Prekaz on the 22nd of January, 1998. With Jashari not present, thousands of Kosovo Albanians descended on Prekaz and again succeeded in pushing the Serbian forces out of the village and its surroundings. The next month, a small unit of the KLA was ambushed by Serb policemen. Four Serbs were killed and two were injured in the ensuing clashes. At dawn on the 5th of March, 1998, the KLA launched an attack against a police patrol in Prekaz, which was then answered by a police operation on the Jashari compound which left 58 Albanians dead, including Jashari and the majority of his family members. Four days after this, a NATO meeting was convoked, during which Madeleine Albright pushed for an anti-Serbian response. NATO now threatened Serbia with a military response. The Kosovo War ensued, with subsequent NATO intervention, which started after the Racak massacre was uncovered during the course of the war.

Attacks
Between 1991 and 1997, mostly in 1996–97, 39 people were killed by the KLA. Attacks between 1996 and February of 1998 led to the deaths of 10 policemen and 24 civilians.

The KLA launched 31 attacks in 1996, 55 in 1997, and 66 in January and February 1998. After the KLA killed four policemen in early March 1998, special Serbian police units retaliated and attacked three villages in Drenica. The total number of attacks by the KLA in 1998 was 1,470, compared to 66 the year before. After the attacks against the Yugoslav police intensified in 1998, security increased as did the presence of Yugoslav Army personnel, which led to the Kosovo War.

See also
History of Kosovo

References

Sources

Further reading

 
Clément, Sophia. Conflict prevention in the Balkans: case studies of Kosovo and the FYR of Macedonia. Institute for Security Studies, Western European Union, 1997.
Kostovičová, Denisa. Parallel worlds: Response of Kosovo Albanians to loss of autonomy in Serbia, 1989–1996. Wolfson College, University of Cambridge, 1996.
Phillips, David L. "Comprehensive Peace in the Balkans: the Kosovo question." Human Rights Quarterly 18.4 (1996): 821–832.
Athanassopoulou, Ekavi. "Hoping for the best, Planning for the worst: Conflict in KOSovo." The World Today (1996): 226–229.
Simic, Predrag. "The Kosovo and Metohija Problem and Regional Security in the Balkans." Kosovo: Avoiding Another Balkan War (1996): 195.
Veremēs, Thanos, and Euangelos Kōphos, eds. Kosovo: avoiding another Balkan war. Hellenic, 1998.
Triantaphyllou, Dimitrios. "Kosovo today: Is there no way out of the deadlock?." European Security 5.2 (1996): 279–302.
Troebst, Stefan, and Alexander: Festschrift Langer. Conflict in Kosovo: failure of prevention?: an analytical documentation, 1992–1998. Vol. 1. Flensburg: European Centre for Minority Issues, 1998.
Heraclides, Alexis. "The Kosovo Conflict and Its Resolution: In Pursuit of Ariadne's Thread." Security Dialogue 28.3 (1997): 317–331.

External links

Riots and civil disorder in Serbia
Kosovo Albanians
Albanian nationalism in Kosovo
Albanian separatism
1995 in Serbia
1996 in Serbia
1997 in Serbia
1998 in Serbia
1990s in Kosovo
Kosovo War
History of Kosovo
Terrorism in Yugoslavia
Terrorism in Serbia
Separatism in Serbia
Yugoslav Wars